Tragocephalini is a tribe of longhorn beetles of the subfamily Lamiinae. It was described by James Thomson in 1857.

Taxonomy
 Anachariesthes Müller, 1949
 Anaplagiomus Téocchi, 1994
 Anatragus Kolbe, 1897
 Aparescus Kolbe, 1900
 Arianida Fairmaire, 1903
 Armatosterna Jordan, 1894
 Auriolus Lepesme, 1947
 Baliesthes Gahan, 1894
 Baliesthoides Breuning, 1958
 Breuningiana Strand, 1936
 Callimation Blanchard, 1844
 Cedemon Gahan, 1890
 Chariesthes Chevrolat, 1858
 Chariesthoides Breuning, 1938
 Chemsakiellus Villiers, 1982
 Cornuchariesthes Breuning, 1981
 Dinocephaloides Breuning, 1951
 Dinocephalus Peringuey, 1899
 Dodechariesthes Teocchi & al., 2010
 Falsonyctopais Lepesme, 1949
 Falsotragiscus Breuning, 1955
 Graciella Jordan, 1894
 Isochariesthes Téocchi, 1993
 Kerochariesthes Teocchi, 1989
 Melanopais Aurivillius, 1927
 Mimochariesthes Teocchi, 1985
 Mimolagrida Breuning, 1947
 Murosternum Jordan, 1934
 Neochariesthes Breuning & Téocchi, 1982
 Nyctopais Thomson, 1858
 Ontochariesthes Teocchi, 1992
 Paracedemon Breuning, 1942
 Parachariesthes Breuning, 1934
 Paradinocephalus Breuning, 1954
 Paragraciella Breuning, 1934
 Paramurosternum Breuning, 1936
 Paraphosphorus Linell, 1896
 Paraplagiomus Breuning & Teocchi, 1980
 Parasolymus Breuning, 1934
 Paraspilotragus Breuning, 1970
 Phosphorus Thomson, 1857
 Phymasterna Laporte de Castelnau, 1840
 Plagiomus Quedenfeldt, 1888
 Poimenesperus Thomson, 1857
 Pseudimalmus Breuning, 1934
 Pseudochariesthes Breuning, 1934
 Pseudophosphorus Breuning, 1934
 Pseudotragiscus Breuning, 1934
 Pseudotragocephala Breuning, 1934
 Rhaphidopsis Gerstäcker, 1855
 Scapochariesthes Breuning, 1948
 Solymus Lacordaire, 1872
 Spilotragoides Breuning, 1981
 Spilotragus Jordan, 1903
 Spinochariesthes Breuning, 1970
 Tragiscoschema Thomson, 1857
 Tragocephala Laporte de Castelnau, 1840
 Tragostoma Aurivillius, 1914
 Tragostomoides Breuning, 1954

References